The 2002–03 Connecticut Huskies women's basketball team represented the University of Connecticut in the 2002–2003 NCAA Division I basketball season. Coached by Geno Auriemma, the Huskies played their home games at the Hartford Civic Center in Hartford, Connecticut, and on campus at the Harry A. Gampel Pavilion in Storrs, Connecticut, and are a member of the Big East Conference.  The only loss the Huskies suffered all year was to Villanova in the championship game of the Big East women's basketball tournament. Villanova beat the Huskies by a score of 52–48. The Huskies won their fourth NCAA championship by defeating the Tennessee Volunteers, 73–68.

Roster
Source

Schedule

|-
!colspan=8| Regular season

|-
!colspan=9| 2003 Big East Women's Basketball Tournament

|-
!colspan=10| 2003 NCAA Division I women's basketball tournament

Team players drafted into the WNBA
No one from the Huskies was selected in the 2003 WNBA draft.

Awards and honors
 Diana Taurasi, Big East Conference Women's Basketball Player of the Year
 Diana Taurasi, Tournament Most Outstanding Player
 Diana Taurasi, Naismith Award
 Diana Taurasi, Wade Trophy

Huskies of Honor induction
On December 29, 2013, the University of Connecticut inducted two women's basketball team, the National Championship winning teams of 2002–03 and 2003–04 into the Huskies of Honor.

See also
UConn–Rutgers rivalry
UConn–Tennessee rivalry

References

Connecticut
UConn Huskies women's basketball seasons
NCAA Division I women's basketball tournament championship seasons
NCAA Division I women's basketball tournament Final Four seasons
Connect
Connect
2003 NCAA Division I women's basketball tournament participants